National Highway 530B, commonly referred to as NH 530B is a national highway in India. It is a secondary route of National Highway 30. NH-530B runs completely in the state of Uttar Pradesh in India. The Highway was Notified on 06 Mar 2018, prior to which, it was a part of UP State Highway 33.

Route 
NH530B connects Bareilly, Budaun, Kasganj, Hathras and Mathura in the state of Uttar Pradesh.

Junctions  
 
  Terminal near Bareilly.
  at Sikandra Rao.
  at Hathras.
 Yamuna Expressway near Raya.
  Terminal at Mathura.

See also 
 List of National Highways in India
 List of National Highways in India by state

References

External links 

 NH 530B on OpenStreetMap

National highways in India
National Highways in Uttar Pradesh